909 may refer to:

909, a year in the 10th century
Area code 909 in the United States

Highways
 Florida State Road 909
 Maryland Route 909
 Saskatchewan Highway 909, in Canada

Military
909th Air Refueling Squadron, part of the United States Air Force
Kosmos 909, a former Russian satellite
Nine-O-Nine, a former Boeing B-17G Flying Fortress (S/N 42-31909)
Type 909 weapon trials ship, a class of ships used by the People's Republic of China
USS LST-909, a former ship of the United States Navy

Music
"One After 909", a song by The Beatles
"Revolution 909", an instrumental single by Daft Punk
Roland TR-909, a drum machine

Other
Aeroflot Flight 909, a 1976 plane crash
CEA-909, an ANSI standard for smart antennas
Porsche 909 Bergspyder, a 1968 sports car
United Nations Security Council Resolution 909, a 1994 resolution pertaining to Rwanda